Tale in the Darkness (translit. Skazka pro temnotu) is a 2009 Russian drama film directed by Nikolay Khomeriki. It competed in the Un Certain Regard section at the 2009 Cannes Film Festival.

Plot
An employee of the Inspectorate for Minors Angelina lives in Vladivostok on the shore of the Sea of Japan. In the southern streets at night and in the daytime young, beautiful, energetic men and women are busy with one thing: getting acquainted, flirting, falling in love. Gelya is completely alone.

Cast
 Alisa Khazanova as Angelina (Gelya)
 Yuri Safarov as Bagrat
 Boris Kamorzin as  Dimych

Awards and nominations
 Bratislava International Film Festival 2009  —  Grand Prix (nom)
 Cannes Film Festival 2009 — Un Certain Regard Award (nom)
 Nika Award 2010 — Best Cinematographer (Alisher Khamidkhodjaev; nom)
 Pacific Meridian   2009 — Award from Vladivostok Mayor (Alisa Khazanova; won)
 Russian Guild of Film Critics 2009 — Best Cinematographer (Alisher Khamidkhodjaev; won), Best Supporting Actor (Boris Kamorzin; won)
 Sochi Open Russian Film Festival 2009 — Best  Actor (Boris Kamorzin; won), Grand Prize of the Festival	Full-Length Film (nom)

References

External links

2009 films
2000s Russian-language films
2009 drama films
Films directed by Nikolay Khomeriki
Russian drama films